Neomordellistena is a subgenus of the beetle genus Neomordellistena in the family Mordellidae, containing the following species:

Neomordellistena albopygidialis Ermisch, 1950
Neomordellistena anticegilvifrons Ermisch, 1967
Neomordellistena atropilosa Ermisch, 1967
Neomordellistena bredoi Ermisch, 1952
Neomordellistena burgeoni (Píc, 1931)
Neomordellistena curtipennis Ermisch, 1950
Neomordellistena distinctipennis Ermisch, 1950
Neomordellistena flavicornis Ermisch, 1950
Neomordellistena flavopila Ermisch, 1967
Neomordellistena ivoirensis Ermisch, 1968
Neomordellistena lestradei Ermisch, 1952
Neomordellistena maculipennis Ermisch, 1950
Neomordellistena notatipennis Ermisch, 1950
Neomordellistena palpalis Ermisch, 1955
Neomordellistena parvula Ermisch, 1952
Neomordellistena picicolor Ermisch, 1952
Neomordellistena roeri Horak, 1995
Neomordellistena ruficeps Ermisch, 1952
Neomordellistena rufopygidialis (Píc, 1950)
Neomordellistena suturalis Ermisch, 1950
Neomordellistena testacea Ermisch, 1950
Neomordellistena tristrigosa Ermisch, 1950
Neomordellistena variabilis (Píc, 1931)

References

Mordellidae
Neomordellistena
Insect subgenera